François-Xavier Bazin (10 May 1824 – 1 August 1865) was an important French archetier and master bow maker, and was first of the Bazin dynasty.

Bazin was born in Mirecourt to Joseph Eustache Bazin (1785-1863), judiciary clerk, and Marguerite Laurent. Notable experts suggest that he  was influenced and purportedly studied with Dominique Peccatte and Jean-Baptiste Vuillaume in Paris, then established himself in Mirecourt around 1840. 
He was brother of Charles-Nicolas Bazin I, and father of Charles Nicolas Bazin II.

On 25 August 1845 he married Jeanne Hélène Maucotel, an embroiderer. They had six children, including Charles Nicolas Bazin, the bow maker.

A catalogue of Louis Bazin & Son mentions him "Manufacture d'Archets de violons - Maison fondée en 1840".  
As the first prominent Bazin bow makers, he fuelled the social rise of the family.
He invested in real estate, including the 'Hauts de Chaumont' vineyard.

Bazin taught  bow making to his son Charles Nicolas Bazin. He died at the age of  41, apparently of cholera. François-Xavier made only a small number of bows, but this was sufficient to establish the family’s reputation.
He made excellent bows in Peccatte style. His bows are rare.

Bazin was a  master bow maker, who was very much influenced by Dominique Peccatte. According to Italian bow expert Paolo Sarri: "Two are the periods of his work. The first, characterized by lines that remind authors such as Nicolas Maline and Joseph Fonclause, with angular shapes influenced the Peccattian school. In the late '50s, following the current fashion, he comes back to a softer style similar to Voirin's one." He added: "Because of his untimely death, Francois Xavier's bows are not so easy to find"

References

 Les Bazin - une dynastie d'archetiers et de luthiers -   Les Amis du Vieux Mirecourt Regain
The Rise & Fall of a Dynasty STRAD 1994 | Les Bazin - une dynastie d'archetiers et de luthiers -   Les Amis du Vieux Mirecourt Regain: translated from French to English by Gennady & Carole  Filimonov
 
 
 
 Discovering bows for the Double Bass  1994 Beaux Arts Editions - Christopher Brown
 Dictionnaire Universel del Luthiers - Rene Vannes 1951,1972, 1985 (vol.3)
 Universal Dictionary of Violin & Bow Makers - William Henley 1970

1824 births
1865 deaths
Bow makers
19th-century French people
Luthiers from Mirecourt